Fast forward is a process of quickly moving through storage media such as cassette tapes.

Fast Forward may also refer to:

Music
 Fast Forward (band), a band formed in 1984 featuring vocalist Ian Lloyd
 Fast Forward (Joe Jackson album), 2015
 Fast Forward (Spyro Gyra album), 1990
 "Fast Forward", a song by Jagúar from the album Get the Funk Out

Publications
 Fast Forward (cassette magazine), a music magazine produced in Australia in the early 1980s
 Fast Forward (magazine), a children's magazine
 Fast Forward Weekly, a Canadian alternative newspaper

Television and film
 Fast Forward (Austrian TV series), Austrian TV series from 2009
 Fast Forward (Australian TV series), an Australian sketch comedy show of the late 1980s and early 1990s
 Fast Forward (film), a 1985 film directed by Sidney Poitier
 Teenage Mutant Ninja Turtles: Fast Forward, a U.S. animated TV series
 Fast Forward, a BBC children's sketch comedy show (1984-1987) starring Nick Wilton and Floella Benjamin

Other
 Fast Forward (startup accelerator) American tech based nonprofit startup accelerator